Lophalia is a genus of beetles in the family Cerambycidae, containing the following species:

 Lophalia auricomis Chemsak & Linsley, 1979
 Lophalia cavei Chemsak & Hovore, in Eya, 2010
 Lophalia cribricollis (Bates, 1892)
 Lophalia cyanicollis (Dupont, 1838)
 Lophalia prolata Chemsak & Linsley, 1988
 Lophalia quadrivittata (Bates, 1892)

References

Trachyderini
Cerambycidae genera